The Knoll Trail station is a future train station along the Dallas Area Rapid Transit Silver Line. The station will be located at 15450 Knoll Trail Drive in Dallas, Texas. The station will serve the Dallas North Tollway corridor and Prestonwood Town Center. The station is expected to open in late 2025 to mid-2026.

References

Dallas Area Rapid Transit commuter rail stations
Richardson, Texas
Proposed public transportation in Texas
Proposed railway stations in the United States

Railway stations scheduled to open in 2025
Railway stations scheduled to open in 2026